Thomas William Harkness  (born December 23, 1937) is a Canadian former professional baseball first baseman, who played in Major League Baseball (MLB) from 1961 to 1964 for the Los Angeles Dodgers and New York Mets.

Baseball career
Harkness was signed by the Philadelphia Phillies before the  season. He was traded by the Phillies on April 5, 1957 along with a player to be named later, Ron Negray, Elmer Valo, a minor league player and $75,000 to the Brooklyn Dodgers in exchange for Chico Fernandez, with the Phillies completing the trade on April 8 when they sent Ben Flowers to the Dodgers.

Los Angeles Dodgers
Harkness made his Major League Baseball debut on September 12, 1961 against the Phillies, working out a walk in five pitches against pitcher Chris Short as a pinch hitter in the ninth inning in a 19–10 loss at the Los Angeles Memorial Coliseum. 
He finished the 1961 season with four hits (including two doubles) in eight at bats, for a .500 batting average. 

In the  season, he appeared in 92 games for the Dodgers, with nine hits (including two doubles and two home runs) in 62 at bats, and seven runs batted in. He hit the first home run of his career on April 17 in the top of the second inning against Mike McCormick to drive in Daryl Spencer, as part of an 8–7 win over the San Francisco Giants at Candlestick Park.

New York Mets
He was traded by the Dodgers to the New York Mets on November 30, together with Larry Burright, in exchange for Bob Miller. In the  season with the Mets, Harkness played in 123 games, achieving 79 hits (including 12 doubles, three triples with 10 home runs) in 375 at bats, for a .211 batting average, together with 41 RBI. His seven times hit by pitch that season tied him for eighth among National League batters.

On April 17, 1964, Harkness led off for the Mets in the bottom of the first inning, collecting a single off Bob Friend in the third inning to become the first Mets player to bat and the first to get a hit in the team's initial game played at new Shea Stadium as part of a 4–3 loss to the Pittsburgh Pirates. With the 1964 Mets, he appeared in 39 games and getting 33 hits in 117 at bats (including two doubles, a triple and two home runs) for a .282 batting average, and 13 RBI. 

On July 28, after Harkness went one-for-four as the Mets' first baseman in a 9–0 loss to the Dodgers, he was traded to the Cincinnati Reds for infielder Bobby Klaus and assigned to Triple-A San Diego. He played at the Triple-A level for the rest of his pro career, retiring after the 1966 season at age 28.

Career summary and retirement
In 259 big-league games played through all or parts of four seasons, Harkness collected 132 hits, with 18 doubles and four triples accompanying his 14 home runs. He batted .235 overall.

References

External links

1937 births
Living people
Anglophone Quebec people
Atlanta Crackers players
Baseball people from Quebec
Buffalo Bisons (minor league) players
Canadian expatriate baseball players in the United States
Cedar Rapids Raiders players
Columbus Jets players
Des Moines Bruins players
Green Bay Bluejays players
Kokomo Dodgers players
Los Angeles Dodgers players
Major League Baseball first basemen
Major League Baseball players from Canada
Montreal Royals players
New York Mets players
Olean Oilers players
People from Lachine, Quebec
San Diego Padres (minor league) players
San Diego Padres scouts
Spokane Indians players
Baseball players from Montreal
Victoria Rosebuds players